Microsphecia tineiformis is a moth of the family Sesiidae. It is found in southern Europe. It has also been recorded from Morocco, Algeria, Tunisia, Asia Minor, Armenia and from Azerbaijan to northern Iran and northern Iraq.

The wingspan is about 11 mm.

The larvae feed on Convolvulus species (including Convolvulus boissieri) and possibly Echium vulgare and Echium violaceum.

References

Moths described in 1789
Sesiidae
Moths of Europe
Moths of Asia